St Margaret's School is an independent, non-denominational day school with a co-educational primary school and an all girls high school. It is the sister school of Berwick Grammar School. The school is located in Berwick, a suburb of Melbourne, Victoria, Australia.

History 
St Margaret's School was established in 1926 with 18 pupils, as an affiliate of the Presbyterian church, in the manse of the Toorak Presbyterian Church. In 1927 St Margaret's School moved to Mayfield Avenue, Malvern, and in 1931 leased the former Governor's residence, Stonington. By the 1930s St Margaret's School had grown to 330 pupils. In 1929 the Berwick Presbyterian Girls’ School was purchased. This branch of the main School was established in 1930, with a purpose-built boarding house, Campbell House.

The school was originally owned by its principal, Dora Gipson, until 1947 when she sold it to the parents and Old Girls as she needed to retire due to illness.

St Margaret's School was incorporated in 1948 and the first Council established.

It operated as a "rural boarding school" and was run as such until 1978. The school has a non-selective enrolment policy and currently caters for approximately 824 students from Pre-Prep to Year 12, across the St Margaret's School campus in Berwick and the boys campus, Berwick Grammar School in Officer.

In 2006, St Margaret's School Council announced its decision to establish a brother school for St Margaret's. This school opened in 2009 named Berwick Grammar School, currently catering for boys in Years 7 to 12.

Sport 
St Margaret's is a member of Girls Sport Victoria (GSV).

GSV premierships 
St Margaret's has won the following GSV premierships.

 Cricket - 2013
 Netball - 2001
 Softball (3) - 2014, 2018, 2019
 Tennis - 2014
 Volleyball - 2018

School staff

Notable alumnae 
Jennifer Byrne – journalist, broadcaster, TV presenter (both ABC and commercial), former book publisher
Rosalie Ham – novelist; author of The Dressmaker
Alison Lester – author and illustrator of children's books and young adult novels
Breann Moody – AFLW footballer for Carlton Football Club
Celine Moody – AFLW footballer for Western Bulldogs
Janette Robyn Heather McMaster – former Executive Director of the Committee for Economic Development of Australia (CEDA) (Qld), former National Director of Trustee Relations for CEDA; recipient of the Centenary Medal 2003
Laetisha Scanlan- Australian Athlete, Sport Shooting and Gold Medalist at the 2014 Commonwealth Games and 2018 Commonwealth Games

See also 
 List of schools in Victoria
 List of high schools in Victoria
 Victorian Certificate of Education

References

External links
St Margaret's School website
Girls Sport Victoria

Girls' schools in Victoria (Australia)
Educational institutions established in 1926
Nondenominational Christian schools in Melbourne
Junior School Heads Association of Australia Member Schools
1926 establishments in Australia
Alliance of Girls' Schools Australasia
Buildings and structures in the City of Casey